The Lahaina, Kaanapali and Pacific Railroad  (LKPRR) is a steam-powered,  narrow gauge heritage railroad in Lāhainā, Hawaii. The tracks connect Lahaina with Puukolii, stopping briefly at Kaanapali. A narrator points outs sites of interest during the trip, which crosses a  curved wooden trestle whose elevation yields panoramic views of neighboring islands and the West Maui Mountains. The line is currently not operating and all equipment is stored west of  Lahaina.

History

The line follows a  stretch of historic right-of-way originally constructed to haul sugarcane from the sugarcane plantation fields in Kāʻanapali to the Pioneer Mill in Lahaina. Trucks, however, largely replaced the railroads by the middle 20th century. In 1969, A.W. "Mac" McKelvey and the Makai Corporation created the railroad in order to illustrate this part of Hawaii's past.

On July 24, 2014, the company announced that it would be closing on August 1, 2014 due to financial difficulties. The company was put up for sale as a going concern.

Within months of closing, the Sugar Cane Train was bought by a local Maui resident Craig Hill owner of Maui Concierge Services. Hill felt that the Sugar Cane Train needed to be kept running in order to preserve one of Lahaina's best-known attractions. The Sugar Cane Train is currently running seasonal "Holiday Express" trains, which run on a short stretch of track in Kaanapali. These trains take place from late November up to December 25. The full line is now in the process of being revived.

The company plans to rebuild all three locomotives from the ground up, as well as possibly add grade crossings to prevent accidents. Plans for the Sugar Cane Train also includes hosting weddings as well as running an evening train. The old tracks are being removed and are being replaced with newer ties and rails. Although the official website stated that operations would resume in 2018, the only trips that operated were the Holiday Express trains. In a 2018 interview, the co-owner of the railroad, Lahaina businessman Todd Domeck stated that the railroad aimed to return to full operations in May 2019, however the railroad didn’t open.  In July 2021, the entire railroad (including track, but excluding right-of-way land) was listed for sale for $400,000 by the Ozark Mountain Railcar brokerage firm.  The sale listing indicates that the buyer will be obligated to dismantle and remove the railroad track materials and rolling stock from the site, as no land is included in the sale.

Motive power

No. 1 Anaka: a  narrow gauge  steam locomotive produced by H.K. Porter, Inc. of Pittsburgh, Pennsylvania in February 1943 for the Carbon Limestone Company.  The engine has undergone extensive exterior modification since it was built by Porter.  It was built as a 0-4-0 saddle tank locomotive.  In this form, it had a large tank surrounding the boiler, which held water for the locomotive.  The LKPRR removed the saddle tanks, added a tender to hold water and fuel, added a larger smokestack, a wooden cab and larger headlight that resembles oil lamps once found on steam locomotives.  These changes transformed the engine from a comparatively austere industrial locomotive, into a more lively and colorful engine representative of many small mainline engines once found on railroads throughout the United States in the late 19th century.
No. 3 Myrtle: produced as a brother engine to No. 1, the No. 3 is also a  narrow gauge  steam locomotive produced by H.K. Porter, Inc. of Pittsburgh, Pennsylvania in February 1943 for the Carbon Limestone Company.  The LKPRR similarly altered the appearance of this engine, but gave it a slightly more modern appearance, representative of a typical oil-burning engine from the early 20th century.  As such, it has a steel cab, whaleback tender, small headlight modeled on an electric prototype, and darker color scheme.  The No. 3's design, name and number were inspired by a historic sugarcane engine built in 1900 for the Hawaii Railroad and retired in 1945.
No. 5: a  narrow gauge outside frame  locomotive.  This engine is not in operating condition, but it is the only steam engine owned by the LKPRR with historical ties to Hawaii.  It once ran on the Oahu Railway and Land Company until it was donated in 1954 to the Travel Town Museum in Los Angeles.  Through an equipment trade with Travel Town, the LKPRR brought No. 5 back to Hawaii, where it remains today awaiting restoration.
No. 45 Oahu: a  narrow gauge MDT Plymouth diesel locomotive

Points of interest
The Hahakea 325-foot wooden trestle
An operating wooden turntable, used for turning locomotives in Lahaina
Views of neighboring islands Lanai and Molokai
Views of the Hale Mahina, also known as the West Maui Mountains
Blowdown by train yard and trestle

See also

List of heritage railroads in the United States

References

External links
Railroad's website

Heritage railroads in Hawaii
3 ft gauge railways in the United States
RailAmerica
Narrow gauge railroads in Hawaii
Transportation in Maui County, Hawaii
Culture of Maui
Tourist attractions in Maui County, Hawaii
Lahaina, Hawaii
1969 establishments in Hawaii
Transportation museums in Hawaii
Railroad museums in the United States